St. James Meeting House is a historic church building at 375 Boardman-Poland Road in Boardman, Ohio. It was built as St. James Episcopal Church in 1828, deconsecrated in 1971, relocated to Boardman Park in 1972, and added to the National Register of Historic Places in 1979.

References

External links
 Official website

Churches completed in 1828
Episcopal churches in Ohio
Churches on the National Register of Historic Places in Ohio
Churches in Mahoning County, Ohio
National Register of Historic Places in Mahoning County, Ohio
19th-century Episcopal church buildings
Relocated buildings and structures in Ohio
1828 establishments in Ohio